Michael Humpal (born February 17, 1985) is a former American football linebacker. He was drafted by the Pittsburgh Steelers of the National Football League (NFL) in the sixth round of the 2008 NFL Draft. He was part of the Steelers' victory over the Arizona Cardinals in Super Bowl XLIII. He played college football at Iowa. As a second career after football, he graduated from Palmer College of Chiropractic and currently practices as Michael J Humpal, DC in North Liberty, IA at Humpal Chiropractic.

Personal life
He was born in New Hampton, Iowa to Reggie and Nancy Humpal. He attended New Hampton High School, where he was an Elite-Team All-State player in football, 2-time state wrestling champion and 2-time state runner-up 110 meter high hurdler and 5th place state discus thrower in track and field.

College career
He recorded 49 tackles in 2006 as a junior, and had a breakout senior season (2007) recording 123 tackles, 5.5 tackles for a loss, and 3 interceptions.

Professional career
Humpal was injured when the Steelers cut him, and no teams signed him, he was once again picked up by the Steelers and placed on Injured reserve. He played college football at Iowa.

On February 26, 2009, Humpal was released by the Steelers.

References

External links
Iowa Hawkeyes bio
Pittsburgh Steelers bio

1985 births
Living people
People from New Hampton, Iowa
Players of American football from Iowa
American football linebackers
Iowa Hawkeyes football players
Pittsburgh Steelers players